"Then" is a song by English alternative rock band the Charlatans. It was released on 10 September 1990 as the second single from the group's debut album, Some Friendly (1990). The song reached number 12 on the UK Singles Chart, number 11 on the Irish Singles Chart, and number four on the US Billboard Modern Rock chart. The music video for "Then" was shot at Hawkstone Park Hotel and Golf Course in Rural Shropshire, England. The Charlatans used this location for the architectural "follies" that are dotted around the grounds of Hawkstone Park.

Track listings
7-inch and cassette single
 "Then"
 "Taurus Moaner"

12-inch single
 "Then"
 "Taurus Moaner"
 "Then" (alternate take)
 "Taurus Moaner" (instrumental)

CD single
 "Then"
 "Taurus Moaner"
 "Taurus Moaner" (instrumental)
 "Then" (alternate take)

Charts

References

The Charlatans (English band) songs
1990 singles
1990 songs